Geoffrey Arthur Williamson MC (1895–1982) was an English classicist and was a graduate of Oxford University. He was Senior Classics Master at Norwich School between 1922 and 1960.

Background 
He was born in 1895. He translated several important histories into the English language.  His translation of Eusebius has been published by Penguin Classics.  He also translated Josephus: The Jewish War (1959) and Procopius: The Secret History (1966).

In 1962 he became the Senior Classics Master at Norwich School and served there until 1960.

He was awarded the Military Cross in 1918. He was the father of the organ builder Martin Williamson.

References

1895 births
1982 deaths
Alumni of the University of Oxford
Translators to English
20th-century translators